The Marquardtbau (German for Marquardt Building) on Stuttgart's Schlossplatz is a former hotel and now houses the theatre Komödie im Marquardt. Today, the building has around 20,000 m2 of floor space and is used as an office, retail and cultural building.

References

Bibliography 
 Uwe Bogen (text); Stefan Bukovsek (photos): Die Königstraße. Wo Stuttgarts Herz schlägt. Gudensberg-Gleichen 2006, p. 43–45
 Uwe Bogen (text); Thomas Wagner (photos): Stuttgart. Eine Stadt verändert ihr Gesicht. Erfurt 2012, pp. 8–9
 Ernst Marquardt: Das Hotel Marquardt in Stuttgart 1840–1938. Ein firmen- und familiengeschichtlicher Versuch (with a preface by R. Vierhaus) I. Part of: Tradition. Zeitschrift für Firmengeschichte und Unternehmerbiographie, 10, 1965, p. 49 (online version)

Buildings and structures in Stuttgart